The White Rose is a 1923 American silent drama film directed by D. W. Griffith. The film was written, produced, and directed by Griffith, and stars Mae Marsh, Ivor Novello, Carol Dempster, and Neil Hamilton. Though this film is extant, it is one of Griffith's rarely seen films.

Plot
A wealthy young Southern aristocrat, Joseph, graduates from a seminary and, before he takes charge of his assigned parish, decides to go out and see what "the real world" is all about. He winds up in New Orleans and finds himself attracted to a poor, unsophisticated orphan girl, Bessie, that he meets at a dance hall. One thing leads to another, and before long Bessie finds that she is pregnant with Joseph's child.

Cast

Production
The film was shot in several locations throughout Florida and Louisiana; including in New Iberia, Louisiana.

Lucille La Verne and Porter Strong played household servant roles in blackface.

Reception
The film was not well received. It was viewed as another typical story of the young innocent girl robbed of her purity told at a very slow pace.

Preservation status
Prints of The White Rose are listed as being located at the George Eastman House Motion Picture Collection, UCLA Film & Television Archive, Academy Film Archive, and several other film archives.

References

External links

Lantern slide at silenthollywood.com
Lobby card at moviessilently.com
Film still at George Eastman House
Still with D.W. Griffith, Mae Marsh, and Ivor Novello at the Wisconsin Historical Society

1923 films
1920s pregnancy films
Films set in New Orleans
American silent feature films
Films directed by D. W. Griffith
1923 drama films
Silent American drama films
American black-and-white films
1920s American films